Arista Nashville is an American record label that serves as a wholly owned division of Sony Music, operated under the Sony Music Nashville division. Founded in 1989, the label specializes in country music artists, including Alan Jackson, Brooks & Dunn, Brad Paisley, and Carrie Underwood,. The label used to operate three sister labels: Career Records, Arista Austin, and Arista Texas/Latin. It is a subsidiary of Arista Records since Arista's relaunch in 2018, but during the dissolution, Arista Nashville was not affected and it remains a Sony Music label.

History
Prior to the formation of its Nashville branch, parent company Arista Records released recordings by Tanya Tucker and Jennifer Warnes in the country music market during the late 1970s and early 1980s. Plans for a Nashville branch of Arista were considered by label founder Clive Davis as early as 1980, but an industry slump at the time caused its delay. In 1989, Davis teamed with songwriter Tim DuBois to form Arista Nashville. The label's initial roster included Asleep at the Wheel, Alan Jackson, Lee Roy Parnell, Pam Tillis, and Michelle Wright. 

Other artists who recorded on the label within its first five years included Blackhawk, Brooks & Dunn, Rob Crosby, Linda Davis, Diamond Rio, Exile, Radney Foster, Dude Mowrey, The Tractors, and Steve Wariner.

The label founded Arista Texas in 1993, a sub-label specializing in Texas music artists. In 1997, it was split into Arista Austin, which featured Jeff Black, Radney Foster, Robert Earl Keen, and Abra Moore, and a Spanish-language label called Arista Latin. Another sub-label, Career Records, was launched in 1995 with Lee Roy Parnell transferred to this label, while Brett James and Tammy Graham were newly signed to it. All three artists moved back to Arista Nashville when Career Records was dissolved. While Graham and James were dropped from it soon afterward, James re-signed to Arista Nashville between 2002 and 2003.

From 2005 to 2017, Arista Nashville, Arista Records, and 19 Recordings promoted and distributed recordings by American Idol winner Carrie Underwood.

In late 2009, Brad Paisley launched a personal label, Sea Gayle, which is distributed through Arista. The label's first signee was Jerrod Niemann.

During the years after the dissolution of Arista Records in 2011, Arista Nashville became Sony Music's only label using the Arista name until Sony
re-launched Arista Records in July 2018.

Current artists
Adam Doleac
Miranda Lambert
Ryan Hurd
Old Dominion
Seaforth
Nate Smith
Morgan Wade

Formerly on Arista Nashville

Brent Anderson
Carlton Anderson
Keith Anderson
Asleep at the Wheel
Sherrié Austin
Adam Brand
Blackhawk
BR549
Kix Brooks
Shannon Brown
Cam
Deana Carter
Jason Michael Carroll
Jim Collins
Kristy Lee Cook
Robert Counts
Rob Crosby
Clint Daniels
Linda Davis
Diamond Rio
The Doobie Brothers
Ronnie Dunn
Seth Ennis
Exile
Radney Foster 
The Henningsens
Faith Hill
Rebecca Lynn Howard
Alan Jackson
Brett James
Carolyn Dawn Johnson
Jypsi
Kristen Kelly
Lanco
Tim McGraw
Logan Mize
Dude Mowrey
Jerrod Niemann
Brad Paisley
Lee Roy Parnell 
The Sisterhood
Matt Stell
The Swon Brothers
Pam Tillis
The Tractors
Ryan Tyler
Carrie Underwood
Phil Vassar
Steve Wariner
Calvin Wiggett
Michelle Wright

Formerly on Career Records

Tammy Graham 
Brett James
Lee Roy Parnell

Formerly on Arista Austin

Jeff Black
Radney Foster
Robert Earl Keen
Abra Moore
Sister 7
Townes Van Zandt

See also
 BNA Records
 RCA Records Nashville
 Columbia Nashville
 Sony Music Nashville
 Arista Records

References

External links 
 Official website

Arista Records
RCA Records Music Group
Sony Music
American country music record labels
Record labels established in 1989
Companies based in Nashville, Tennessee